Nazi concentration camps in Norway (Norwegian: konsentrasjonsleirer) were concentration camps or prisons in Norway established or taken over by the Quisling regime and Nazi German authorities during the German occupation of Norway that began on 9 April 1940 and used for internment of persons by the Nazi authorities. 709 prison camps or concentration camps, [including some death camps,] were counted by a project that had Randi Bratteli (author and widow of former prime minister and concentration camp prisoner), as an advisor. Another source has claimed that there were around 620 prison camps.

There were [at least] 14 different categories of prisoners, in addition to forced laborers, and they came from various countries.

The civilian occupying authorities with the Quisling regime and the German Wehrmacht operated a number of camps in Norway, including around 110 prison camps.

The Wehrmacht camps were largely POW camps and were scattered throughout the country. Some of these had extremely high mortality rates, owing to inhumane conditions and brutality.

Both established and improvised jails and prisons throughout the country were also used for internment by the Nazi authorities. In particular the Sicherheitspolizei and Sicherheitsdienst, headquartered at Victoria Terrasse, were notorious for torture and abuse of prisoners. Also, Arkivet in Kristiansand and Bandeklosteret in Trondheim became synonymous with torture and abuse. Some distinction was made between camps and prisons run by Norwegian Nazis and those run by German Nazi organizations, though it is safe to say that all atrocities took place under the authority of a unified command.

The designated concentration camps were not classified as "KZ-Lager" by the Nazis, but rather as Häftingslager ("detainee camps") under the administration of the Nazi "security police," the SS and Gestapo. The Nazi authorities deported over 700 Jews from Norway to Auschwitz, over 500 Nacht und Nebel prisoners to Natzweiler; and thousands more to Sachsenhausen, Ravensbrück and other prisons and camps in Germany. Most of these were kept in Norwegian camps during transit.

Although abuse, torture, and murder were commonplace in these camps, none of them were designated or functioned as extermination camps, nor did they reach the scale seen in camps in Germany, occupied Poland, and Austria. It is estimated that between 38,000 and 40,000 individuals passed through this camp system, for a total of 60,000 prisoner years.

The camps served varying purposes, including:
 internment of political prisoners, especially socialists and communists, but also religious dissenters.
 internment of prisoners of war (Stammlager / Stalag) - especially Soviet and Yugoslavian soldiers
 internment of so-called "bomb hostages" (Geisellager) - prominent Norwegians who would be executed in the event of the resistance movement bombing Nazi targets
 transit internment of various prisoners bound for camps in Germany and Poland (Durchgangslager / Dulag) - including Jews, prominent political prisoners, and others.

The Nazi authorities destroyed most of the records related to the camps and prisons they ran during the occupation. Effectively every local prison was used for these purposes by the Nazis, but several full-fledged camps were also established.

Finnmark and Troms county

Finnmark
In then-county of Finnmark, 110 prison camps had a total of around 14,000 prisoners, including 10,000 Soviet POWs that had been transported to Oslo via Germany, then on to Trondheim before being sailed northwards. Some prisoners came from the German penal system. Some prisoners were Norwegian including those who had been linked to the so-called Teacher Strike of 1942.

In Karasjok, Karasjok prison camp  received around 400 prisoners.

Sør-Varanger (municipality)
Høybuktmoen
At Neiden there was a camp for Russian [and other Soviet] POWs.
Leirpollen (article at simple English Wikipedia). Located at Lille Leirpollbukt, there were two prison camps - one for Soviet soldiers, and one for Norwegian, Poles and Czechs. One of these camps held suspected members of the Persfjord Group—partisans on the Varanger Peninsula. In 1943 eleven prisoners were bludgeoned to death.
Storskog
Tofte, Finnmark, also known as Jarfjordbotn
The prison camp at Gjøk-åsen, in the Pasvik valley.

There were concentration camps for teachers at
Kirkenes
Elvenes
Sandnes

Troms
Bardufoss concentration camp
Krøkebærsletta
Kvænangen concentration camp ( It consisted of two subcamps, Veidal and Badderen, which was also known as Veiskaret.)
Sydspissen concentration camp
Tromsdalen detention camp

Nordland

28 prison camps were located between Mo i Rana and Fauske (and 25 of these were for Soviet POWs).

Lager I Beisfjord ("No. 1 camp Beisfjord" - in Norwegian Beisfjord fangeleir)
Railroad slaves lived in "barracks near Bjørnelva".

Trøndelag

In Levanger there was the Falstad concentration camp near the SS-camp Falstad.
At Oppdal was Stalag 308, supplying forced labor for the construction of the Nordland Line.
At Orkdal was Fannrem concentration camp where the prisoners were sent to work on the Orkdal Line. (This camp was a utekommando—satellite camp of the Grini concentration camp.)
In Trondheim was Vollan prison.

Vestland

Hordaland
Ulven concentration camp
Espeland concentration camp
In Bergen: Storetveit skole had 268 prisoners.
At Framnes at Norheimsund, a boarding school was turned into a detention camp.

Vestfold og Telemark

Vestfold

In Færder, on the Bolærne archipelago, there was a death camp for Russians on Mellom Bolæren [present-day Midtre Bolærne ].
Tønsberg had Berg internment camp (Berg interneringsleir)

Viken

Akershus
Bærum had Grini concentration camp.
Lillestrøm had a prison camp at Øvredalen skole in Gansdalen. It had [Soviet] prisoners. 
Nittedal had Åneby fangeleir.

Østfold
Indre Østfold had SS-Sonderlager Mysen, located in Mysen.

Oslo

At Ljanskollen in the borough of Søndre Nordstrand there was ' [German: Lager Ljanskollen; "Ljanskollen prison camp", presently also known as "Fangeleir Fiskevollen". The prisoners constructed an oil line (including oil pump), that went 100 metres into the bedrock; the oil line went on up to a railway sideline that came from Holmlia; the camp at Ljanskollen had a majority of Norwegian prisoners, and it was a satellite camp of Grini Concentration Camp.

See also
Beisfjord massacre

References

External links
 Findings from the Eitinger commission related to, inter alia, camps in Norway
[article with several hundre Soviet POWs in one photo] 70 år siden Operasjon Asfalt:Et dystert minne. Ságat.no

 
Norway
Concentration camps

no:Konsentrasjonsleir